Streptocarpus shumensis, synonym Saintpaulia shumensis, is a species of Streptocarpus in the section Saintpaulia. It is endemic to Shume in the west Usambara Mountains and also from the northern Nguru Mountains, both in Tanzania, where it grows at altitudes of 1,300 to 2,000 meters above sea level.

References

 Notes Roy. Bot. Gard. Edinburgh 21: 238 1955.

shumensis
Endemic flora of Tanzania